Coleophora phlomidella is a moth of the family Coleophoridae. It is found in southern Russia and central Asia.

The larvae feed on the leaves of Phlomis pungens and Phlomis kopetdaghensis. They create a large lobe case. The rear part is strongly curved downwards and the mouth angle is about 45°. Leaf fragments that compose the case are alternating light and dark. Larvae can be found from autumn to June.

References

phlomidella
Moths of Asia
Moths described in 1862